Hermachola is a genus of southern African mygalomorph spiders in the family Entypesidae. It was first described by J. Hewitt in 1915, and it has only been found in South Africa.  it contains only three species: H. capensis, H. crudeni, and H. lyleae. It was previously considered a junior synonym of Hermacha , but was elevated to genus in 2021. The type species, Hermachola crudeni, was originally described under the name "Hermacha crudeni".

See also
 Hermacha
 Brachythele
 List of Entypesidae species

References

Further reading

Entypesidae
Mygalomorphae genera
Spiders of South Africa